is a former Japanese football player.

Playing career
Uchida was born in Nagasaki Prefecture on August 12, 1972. After graduating from Meiji University, he joined Nagoya Grampus Eight in 1995. On April 22, he debuted against Kashima Antlers. However he could only play this match until 1996. In 1997, he moved to Cerezo Osaka. He played many matches as defensive midfielder. He retired end of 2000 season.

Club statistics

References

External links

1972 births
Living people
Meiji University alumni
Association football people from Nagasaki Prefecture
Japanese footballers
J1 League players
Nagoya Grampus players
Cerezo Osaka players
Association football midfielders